Jordan Theodore (born December 11, 1989) is an American-born naturalized Macedonian professional basketball player who last played for Reyer Venezia of the Lega Basket Serie A. He also represents the senior North Macedonia national team. He played college basketball at Seton Hall.

High school career
Theodore grew up in Englewood, New Jersey, and attended and played high school basketball at Paterson Catholic High School.

College career
Theodore played his entire college basketball career at Seton Hall University, with the Seton Hall Pirates. He finished his senior season with the Pirates, averaging 16.1 points per game and 6.6 assists per game.
Theodore broke Golden Sunkett's single-season school record of 197 assists. He had 226 assists in his senior season. The previous record was set 49 years prior, in the 1962–63 season.

Professional career
On July 15, 2012, Theodore signed to play with Antalya BSB of the Turkish BSL. On March 21, 2013, Theodore signed with the Adriatic League club Cedevita. A week later he was released, as his team, Antalya BSB, did not agree to release him.

In May 2013, Theodore has signed with Mets de Guaynabo, of Puerto Rico's top league, the BSN. On July 17, 2013, Theodore signed with Huracanes del Atlántico, of the Dominican League. On October 22, 2013, Theodore returned to the Turkish BSL, signing with Mersin BSB. He finished the Turkish League season with an average of 12.3 points per game, but didn't help the team to avoid relegation.

On January 12, 2015, he signed at JL Bourg-en-Bresse of the French LNB Pro A. On September 17, 2015, he signed with the German BBL team Fraport Skyliners. On July 28, 2016, Theodore signed with the Turkish club Banvit. In February, he won the Turkish Cup with Banvit. Theodore was named the Turkish Cup Final MVP.

Banvit also played in one of the two European-wide secondary leagues, the FIBA Champions League, as well, and in that competition, Theodore was named the Quarter-finals MVP, after his team defeated MHP Riesen Ludwigsburg, in a two-leg series. On April 30, Theodore was named the MVP of the FIBA Champions League's 2016–17 season.

On July 15, 2017, Theodore signed a two-year contract with the Italian LBA club Olimpia Milano. On September 24, 2017, Olimpia Milano won the 2017 Italian Supercup. Theodore was named tournament's MVP, after a game in which he had 29 points, 7 rebounds and 5 assists.

On January 4, 2019, Theodore signed a contract with the Greek Basket League club AEK Athens, which kept him at the club until the end of the 2018-19 Greek Basket League season.

On July 26, 2019, Theodore signed a contract with Beşiktaş Sompo Japan of the Basketbol Süper Ligi.

On December 27, 2019, Theodore signed a contract with UNICS Kazan of the VTB United League. He averaged 10.3 points, 4.5 rebounds and 7.7 assists per game. Theodore parted ways with the team on July 16, 2020.

On November 20, 2020, Theodore signed a new contract with UNICS Kazan of the VTB United League. On June 23, 2021, he signed with Alvark Tokyo of the Japanese B.League. However, he failed the physical and was released from the team.

On January 18, 2022, Theodore signed with Reyer Venezia of the Italian Lega Basket Serie A.

National team career
Theodore gained Macedonian citizenship in 2017, so that he could represent the senior Macedonian national basketball team. With North Macedonia, he played at the 2019 FIBA World Cup European Qualification.

Career statistics

FIBA Champions League

|-
| style="text-align:left;" | 2018–19
| style="text-align:left;" | A.E.K.
| 8 || 27.0 || .365 || .273 || .714 || 2.4 || 4.5 || 1.4 || .1 || 9.4
|}

Domestic Leagues

Regular season

|-
| 2018–19
| style="text-align:left;"| A.E.K.
| align=center | GBL
| 8 || 22.2 || .632 || .476 || .882 || 1.9 || 3.5 || 1.3 || 0 || 12.1
|}

References

External links
 FIBA Profile
 Euroleague.net Profile
 Eurobasket.com Profile
 Italian League Profile 
 Greek Basket League Profile 
 German BBL Profile  
 ESPN NCAA College Profile
 TBLStat.net Profile

1989 births
Living people
AEK B.C. players
American expatriate basketball people in France
American expatriate basketball people in Germany
American expatriate basketball people in Greece
American expatriate basketball people in Italy
American expatriate basketball people in Russia
American expatriate basketball people in Turkey
American men's basketball players
Antalya Büyükşehir Belediyesi players
Bandırma B.İ.K. players
Basketball players from New Jersey
BC UNICS players
Beşiktaş men's basketball players
Huracanes del Atlántico players
JL Bourg-en-Bresse players
Macedonian expatriate basketball people in Russia
Macedonian expatriate basketball people in Turkey
Macedonian men's basketball players
Mersin Büyükşehir Belediyesi S.K. players
Olimpia Milano players
People from Englewood, New Jersey
Point guards
Reyer Venezia players
Seton Hall Pirates men's basketball players
Skyliners Frankfurt players
Sportspeople from Bergen County, New Jersey